Wanda at Large is an American sitcom starring Wanda Sykes; Sykes also created the series alongside Bruce Helford, Les Firestein, and Lance Crouther. The series aired for two seasons on Fox from March 26 to November 7, 2003.

Synopsis
Sykes starred as Wanda Hawkins, a former government worker who decides to become a stand-up comedian. Through her friend Keith (Dale Godboldo), Wanda is tapped by WHDC-TV head Roger to become a new editorial correspondent for the low-rated political talk show The Beltway Gang . She is immediately seen as unprofessional and inexperienced by the show's moderators, Bradley (Phil Morris) and Rita (Ann Magnuson), whose conservative politics clash with Wanda's liberal views. At home, she must deal with her sister-in-law Jenny (Tammy Lauren), a widow raising Wanda's niece Holly (Jurnee Smollett) and nephew Barris (Robert Bailey Jr.), whom Wanda finds irritating. As the show progresses, Wanda begins to bond with her family and win over her colleagues, with some hinted attraction to Bradley.

Cast
 Wanda Sykes as Wanda Hawkins
 Dale Godboldo as Keith Townsend
 Phil Morris as Bradley Grimes
 Tammy Lauren as Jenny Hawkins
 Jurnee Smollett as Holly Hawkins
 Robert Bailey Jr. as Barris Hawkins

Recurring
 Jason Kravitz as Roger
 Ann Magnuson as Rita Bahlberg

Episodes

Season 1 (2003)

Season 2 (2003)

Note: The unaired second-season episodes were aired for the first time on TV One on July 4, 2006, during the 4th of July launch marathon of the series.

Production and cancellation

Fox premiered it on March 26, 2003. Fox renewed the show for a second season. The show returned with new episodes in September 2003, but in the so-called Friday night death slot at 8:00pm. It was canceled on November 7, along with the new Fox comedy series Luis.

During an interview with the Urbanite magazine at Georgia State University, Sykes explained that the show was only supposed to be on Friday night for an interim basis. According to Sykes, "We were told if the new night didn't work out, we would be moved to another timeslot. But, that's part of the game television execs play." She also admitted in a January 2004 interview that she wished that the series would have launched on UPN instead of Fox.

Broadcast and syndication
Reruns began airing regularly on July 5, 2006 on American cable channel TV One. A marathon aired on July 4 as part of the channel's "Power to the People" July 4 weekend celebration.

In 2022, the series is made available for streaming online on Fox Corporation's Tubi.

Reception

Ratings
Wanda at Large premiered on Fox on March 26, 2003, following American Idol. It gradually decreased in the ratings, premiering with 14.3 million viewers, and diminishing to 10 million by the season finale. It still averaged 12.2 million for the six-episode season, however, making it the fourth highest-rated show on Fox that year out of 26, and leading Fox to renew the show. In September, the show returned with new episodes in the Friday night death slot at 8:30pm.

Awards and nominations

References

External links
 
 
 Wanda at Large on Rotten Tomatoes
 

2000s American sitcoms
2000s American black sitcoms
2003 American television series debuts
2003 American television series endings
Television series about dysfunctional families
English-language television shows
Fox Broadcasting Company original programming
Television series by Warner Bros. Television Studios
Television shows set in Washington, D.C.
Television series created by Bruce Helford
Television series by Mohawk Productions